Struttin' and Shoutin' is an album by trombonist Al Grey recorded in 1976 but not released on Columbia Records until 1983.

Reception 

The Rolling Stone Jazz Record Guide said "the entire date has an energetic but familiar feel". The Allmusic review stated "Trombonist Al Grey, a master of the wah-wah mute, had a rare opportunity to record with a major label in 1976. But Columbia almost lost the master, and when it was finally released in 1983, one of the principals (tenor saxophonist Jimmy Forrest) had already died. Despite its delayed arrival, this upbeat set (dominated by soulful blues but also including two standards) was worth the wait".

Track listing 
All compositions by Al Grey except where noted
 "Blues, Ray and Grey" (Ernie Wilkins) – 6:48
 "Stardust" (Hoagy Carmichael, Mitchell Parish) – 5:55
 "Reverend Grey" – 6:01
 "Struttin' and Shoutin'" – 5:04
 "All of Me" (Gerald Marks, Seymour Simons) – 4:25
 "Potholes" (Wilkins) – 4:05
 "Homage to Norman" – 3:00

Personnel 
Al Grey – trombone
Danny Moore, Waymon Reed – trumpet
Jack Jeffers – bass trombone
Ernie Wilkins – soprano saxophone (track 2)
Jimmy Forrest – tenor saxophone
Cecil Payne – baritone saxophone
Ray Bryant – piano
Milt Hinton – bass
Bobby Durham – drums

References 

1983 albums
Al Grey albums
Columbia Records albums
Albums produced by John Hammond (producer)